Academy Gardens is a Neo-Georgian apartment complex in Duchess of Bedford's Walk, Kensington, London W8. It was built in 1914 as Queen Elizabeth College, the Ladies' (later Women's) Department of King's College, London.

It was designed by H. Percy Adams and Charles Holden, and is Grade II listed.

References

External links

Charles Holden buildings
Grade II listed buildings in the Royal Borough of Kensington and Chelsea
Kensington
Residential buildings completed in 1914
Grade II listed residential buildings